Electoral history of Boris Yeltsin, 1st President of Russia.

People's Deputy of the Soviet Union

1989

1st Moscow constituency:
Boris Yeltsin — 91.53%

Chairman of the Supreme Soviet of Russia

1990
Boris Yeltsin — 535 votes 
Aleksandr Vlasov — 467 votes

President of Russia

1991

1996

References

Boris Yeltsin
Yeltsin